Doultabad is a Mandal in Medak district of Telangana, India.

References 

Mandal headquarters in Siddipet district
Villages in Siddipet district